Bertuzzi is an Italian surname that may refer to:
Aldo Bertuzzi (born 1961), Italian racing driver
Ercole Gaetano Bertuzzi (1668-1710), Italian painter
Irnerio Bertuzzi (1919–1962), Italian airplane pilot
Nicola Bertuzzi (died 1777), Italian Rococo painter
Todd Bertuzzi (born 1975), Canadian hockey player
Todd Bertuzzi–Steve Moore incident
Tyler Bertuzzi (born 1995), Canadian ice hockey player, nephew of Todd

See also
Bertucci

Italian-language surnames